Gasthof Herold is one of the oldest breweries in Büchenbach, Bavaria, Germany, founded in 1568.

Since the foundation it is a family business today managed by Johann und Matthias Herold and the annual production is about 1200 hl.

The part of the business is a bakery, restaurant and a beer garden.

See also 
List of oldest companies

References

External links 
Homepage
Location on Google Maps

Breweries in Germany
Beer brands of Germany
Companies established in the 16th century
16th-century establishments in the Holy Roman Empire
Food and drink companies established in the 16th century